Ballinger is a hamlet and common in the parish of Great Missenden (where at the 2011 Census the population was included), in Buckinghamshire, England.  It is situated in the nearby Chiltern Hills, close to the border with the parish of Chesham.

Ballinger has a small church which is a former Mission Hall, down Blackthorne Lane.  Originally it held Methodist services but now holds a monthly Anglican service the first Sunday of each month, as part of the Parish of Great Missenden.

External links
 Ballinger Village Hall website - News and Events
 Ballinger Waggoners Cricket Club
 Ballinger Bombers Football Club
 Ballinger village website
 Ballinger St Mary's Mission Hall

Hamlets in Buckinghamshire